Yelyzaveta Serhiyivna Hubareva (born 16 June 2004) is a Ukrainian artistic gymnast. She was a member of the gold medal-winning team at the 2020 European Championships.

Early life
Hubareva was born in Donetsk, Donetsk Oblast, Ukraine on 16 June 2004. She began gymnastics in 2010 after being introduced to the sport by her mother, who would become her first coach.

Gymnastics career

Junior

2019 
In March, Hubareva competed at the Ukrainian Championships. She placed second in the all-around. She would later compete at the Stella Zakharova Cup, winning gold on floor exercise.

In June Hubareva competed at the inaugural Junior World Championships held in Győr, Hungary alongside Anastasia Motak and Daria Murzhak.  They finished 13th as a team.  They next competed at the European Youth Olympic Festival where they finished 10th as a team.

Senior

2020 
In September, Hubareva made her senior debut at the Ukrainian Championships.  She placed third in the all-around and second on floor exercise.

In December, Hubareva competed at the European Championships. During the qualification, she helped Ukraine qualify to the team final in second place behind Romania and individually, she qualified to the uneven bars final. During the team final, she competed on the vault and floor exercise, contributing towards Ukraine's gold medal finish ahead of Romania. In the uneven bars final, she finished in seventh place.

2021 
Hubareva competed at the World Challenge Cups in Koper and Mersin, winning the silver on the uneven bars in the latter behind Zója Székely.  In October Hubareva competed at the World Championships where she placed 14th in the all-around.

In November Hubareva competed at the Arthur Gander Memorial.  She placed fourth in the three-event all-around, behind Angelina Melnikova of Russia, Taïs Boura of France, and Ciena Alipio of the United States.  Next she competed at the Swiss Cup where she was partnered with Illia Kovtun.  They finished second in the competition behind of the Russian team of Nikita Nagornyy and Melnikova.

Competitive history

References

External links
 

2004 births
Living people
Sportspeople from Donetsk
Ukrainian female artistic gymnasts
European champions in gymnastics
21st-century Ukrainian women